The Qingming festival or Ching Ming Festival, also known as Tomb-Sweeping Day in English (sometimes also called Chinese Memorial Day, Ancestors' Day, the Clear Brightness Festival, or the Pure Brightness Festival), is a traditional Chinese festival observed by ethnic Chinese in mainland China, Hong Kong, Macau, Taiwan, Malaysia, Singapore, Cambodia, Indonesia, Philippines, Thailand, Vietnam and Panama. A celebration of spring, it falls on the first day of the fifth solar term (also called Qingming) of the traditional Chinese lunisolar calendar. This makes it the 15th day after the Spring Equinox, either 4, 5 or 6 April in a given year. During Qingming, Chinese families visit the tombs of their ancestors to clean the gravesites and make ritual offerings to their ancestors. Offerings would typically include traditional food dishes and the burning of joss sticks and joss paper. The holiday recognizes the traditional reverence of one's ancestors in Chinese culture.

The origins of the Qingming Festival go back more than 2500 years, although the observance has changed significantly. It became a public holiday in mainland China in 2008, where it is associated with the consumption of qingtuan, green dumplings made of glutinous rice and Chinese mugwort or barley grass.

In Taiwan, the public holiday was in the past observed on 5 April to honor the death of Chiang Kai-shek on that day in 1975, but with Chiang's popularity waning, this convention is not being observed. A confection called caozaiguo or shuchuguo, made with Jersey cudweed, is consumed there.

A similar holiday is observed in the Ryukyu Islands, called Shīmī in the local language.

Origin

The festival originated from the Cold Food or Hanshi Festival which is said to commemorate Jie Zitui, a nobleman of the state of Jin (modern Shanxi) during the Spring and Autumn Period. Amid the Li Ji Unrest, he followed his master Prince Chong'er in 655BC to exile among the Di tribes and around China. Supposedly, he once even cut flesh from his own thigh to provide his lord with soup. In 636BC, Duke Mu of Qin invaded Jin and enthroned Chong'er as its duke, where he was generous in rewarding those who had helped him in his time of need. Owing either to his own high-mindedness or to the duke's neglect, however, Jie was long passed over. He finally retired to the forest around Mount Mian with his elderly mother. The duke went to the forest in  but could not find them. He then ordered his men to set fire to the forest in order to force Jie out. When Jie and his mother were killed instead, the duke ordered that thenceforth no one should light a fire on the date of Jie's death. The people of Shanxi subsequently revered Jie as an immortal and avoided lighting fires for as long as a month in the depths of winter, a practice so injurious to children and the elderly that the area's rulers unsuccessfully attempted to ban it for centuries. A compromise finally developed where it was restricted to 3 days around the Qingming solar term in mid-spring.

The present importance of the holiday is credited to Emperor Xuanzong of Tang. Wealthy citizens in China were reportedly holding too many extravagant and ostentatiously expensive ceremonies in honor of their ancestors. In , Xuanzong sought to curb this practice by declaring that such respects could be formally paid only once a year, on Qingming.

Observance

Qingming Festival is when Chinese people traditionally visit ancestral tombs to sweep them. This tradition has been legislated by the Emperors who built majestic imperial tombstones for every dynasty. For thousands of years, the Chinese imperials, nobility, peasantry, and merchants alike have gathered together to remember the lives of the departed, to visit their tombstones to perform Confucian filial piety by tombsweeping, to visit burial grounds, graveyards or in modern urban cities, the city columbaria, to perform groundskeeping and maintenance and to commit to pray for their ancestors in the uniquely Chinese concept of the afterlife and to offer remembrances of their ancestors to living blood relatives, their kith and kin. In some places, people believe that sweeping the tomb is only allowed during this festival, as they believe the dead will get disturbed if the sweeping is done on other days.

The young and old alike kneel down to offer prayers before tombstones of the ancestors, offer the burning of joss in both the forms of incense sticks (joss-sticks) and silver-leafed paper (joss paper), sweep the tombs and offer food in memory of the ancestors. Depending on the religion of the observers, some pray to a higher deity to honour their ancestors, while others may pray directly to the ancestral spirits.

People who live far away and can't travel to their ancestors' tombs may make a sacrifice from a distance.

These rites have a long tradition in Asia, especially among the imperialty who legislated these rituals into a national religion. They have been preserved especially by the peasantry and are most popular with farmers today, who believe that continued observances will ensure fruitful harvests ahead by appeasing the spirits in the other world.

Religious symbols of ritual purity, such as pomegranate and willow branches, are popular at this time. Some people wear willow twigs on their heads on Qingming or stick willow branches on their homes. There are similarities to palm leaves used on Palm Sundays in Christianity; both are religious rituals. Furthermore, the belief is that the willow branches will help ward off misfortune.

After gathering on Qingming to perform Confucian clan and family duties at the tombstones, graveyards or columbaria, participants spend the rest of the day in clan or family outings, before they start the spring plowing. Historically, people would often sing and dance, and Qingming was a time when young couples traditionally started courting. Another popular thing to do is to fly kites in the shapes of animals or characters from folk tales or Chinese opera. Another common practice is to carry flowers instead of burning paper, incense, or firecrackers.

Traditionally, a family will burn spirit money(joss paper) and paper replicas of material goods such as cars, homes, phones and paper servants. This action usually happens during the Qingming festival. In Chinese culture, it is believed that people still need all of those things in the afterlife. Then family members take turns to kowtow three to nine times (depending on the family adherence to traditional values) before the tomb of the ancestors. The Kowtowing ritual in front of the grave is performed in the order of patriarchal seniority within the family. After the ancestor worship at the grave site, the whole family or the whole clan feast on the food and drink they have brought for the worship. Another ritual related to the festival is the cockfight, as well as being available within that historic and cultural context at Kaifeng Millennium City Park (Qingming Riverside Landscape Garden).

The holiday is often marked by people paying respects to those who are considered national or legendary heroes or those exemplary Chinese figures who died in events considered politically sensitive. The April Fifth Movement and the Tiananmen Incident were major events in Chinese history which occurred on Qingming. After Premier Zhou Enlai died in 1976, thousands honored him during the festival to pay their respects. Some also pay respects to politically sensitive people such as Zhao Ziyang.

Malaysia and Singapore

Despite the festival having no official status, the overseas Chinese communities in Southeast Asian nations, such as those in Singapore and Malaysia, take this festival seriously and observe its traditions faithfully. Some Qingming rituals and ancestral veneration decorum observed by the overseas Chinese in Malaysia and Singapore can be dated back to Ming and Qing dynasties, as the overseas communities were not affected by the Cultural Revolution in Mainland China. Qingming in Malaysia is an elaborate family function or a clan feast (usually organized by the respective clan association) to commemorate and honour recently deceased relatives at their grave sites and distant ancestors from China at home altars, clan temples or makeshift altars in Buddhist or Taoist temples. For the overseas Chinese community, the Qingming festival is very much a solemn family event and, at the same time, a family obligation. They see this festival as a time of reflection for honouring and giving thanks to their forefathers. Overseas Chinese normally visit the graves of their recently deceased relatives on the  weekend nearest to the actual date. According to the ancient custom, grave site veneration is only permissible ten days before and after the Qingming Festival. If the visit is not on the actual date, normally veneration before Qingming is encouraged. The Qingming Festival in Malaysia and Singapore normally starts early in the morning by paying respect to distant ancestors from China at home altars. This is followed by visiting the graves of close relatives in the country. Some follow the concept of filial piety to the extent of visiting the graves of their ancestors in mainland China.

Other customs

Games

Each side also had its own team of drummers to encourage the participants. In honor of these customs, families often go hiking or kiting, play Chinese soccer or tug-of-war and plant trees, including willow trees.

Buddhism
The Qingming festival is also a part of spiritual and religious practices in China, and is associated with Buddhism. For example, Buddhism teaches that those who die with guilt are unable to eat in the afterlife, except on the day of the Qingming festival.

Chinese tea culture

The Qingming festival holiday has a significance in the Chinese tea culture since this specific day divides the fresh green teas by their picking dates. Green teas made from leaves picked before this date are given the prestigious 'pre-Qingming tea' designation which commands a much higher price tag. These teas are prized for their aroma, taste, and tenderness.

Weather
The Qingming festival was originally considered the day with the best spring weather, when many people would go out and travel. The Old Book of Tang describes this custom and mentions of it may be found in ancient poetry.

In painting

The famous Song dynasty  Qingming scroll attributed to Zhang Zeduan may portray Kaifeng city, the capital of the Song Dynasty, but does not include any of the activities associated with the holiday, however, and the term "Qingming" may not refer to the holiday.

In literature
Qingming was frequently mentioned in Chinese literature. Among these, the most famous one is probably Du Mu's poem (simply titled "Qingming"):

Although the date is not presently a holiday in Vietnam, the Qingming festival is mentioned (under the name Thanh Minh) in the epic poem The Tale of Kieu, when the protagonist Kieu meets a ghost of a dead old lady. The description of the scenery during this festival is one of the best-known passages of Vietnamese literature:

See also 

 Along the River During Ching Ming Festival by Zhang Zeduan
 Cold Food Festival, three consecutive days starting the day before the Qingming Festival
 Day of the Dead, a Mexican celebration similar to the Qingming Festival 
 Double Ninth Festival, the other day to visit and clean up the cemeteries in Hong Kong
 Bon Festival, the Japanese counterpart of the Ghost Festival
 Hansik, a related Korean holiday on the same day
 Dust Clearing, a similar ritual in the Middle-East
 Radonitsa / Pomynky, a similar holiday of Eastern Slavs
 Traditional Chinese holidays
 Filial piety in Chinese culture
 The Parentalia in Roman culture

References

Further Reading

External links
 

Buddhist festivals in China
Festivals in Chinese folk religion
Festivals in China
April observances
Observances honoring the dead
Observances set by the Chinese calendar
Public holidays in China
Public holidays in Hong Kong
Public holidays in Taiwan
Spring festivals
Spring (season) events in China